The Pagliarelli Prison is a Maximum security prison in the Pagliarelli neighbourhood of Palermo, Sicily, Italy.

History
Pagliarelli was built in 1980, became operational in 1996 and it is adjacent and adjoined to the Tribunal of Palermo. The prison is situated behind the mountain ranges of Madonie and is a very large structure and of reinforced concrete (RC), for both men and woman, in the chief town of the island. Pagliarelli is divided into 8 departments: Scirocco (Maestrale and Libeccio), South (or “Mari”: Tirreno, Adriatico and Ionio), and Est (or “Pianeti”: Marte, Plutone and Giove) with a total of almost one thousand inmates. Some rules of the institute seem to be very punitive as regards improped and prohibited behaviours.

In June 2015, an Albanian was discovered (and filmed by cameras) just in time during a jailbreak, and just after was killed by the owner of the house he was robbing.

The prison today
Pagliarelli is a Maximum Security Prison holding prisoners from all over Italy. Moreover, Pagliarelli is a local prison, accepting different categories of prisoners and from different countries, especially from Romania and Tunisia. In addition the establishment serves the Tribunal, the Judiciary of Surveillance (Ufficio di Sorveglianza) and UEPE. 
Accommodation at the prison is a mixture of approximately 70% multi-occupancy cells and 30% single cells, distributed mainly across 3 residential units.

Inmates at Pagliarelli are offered access to education, workshops, two gyms, one focusing on Physical Education courses.

References

External links

Buildings and structures in Palermo
Prisons in Italy